The Bureau International des Expositions (BIE) sanctions world expositions. Some have been recognised retrospectively because they took place before the BIE came into existence.

The designation "World Exposition" refers to a class of the largest, general scope exhibitions of up to 6 months' duration.

This list does not include BIE-recognised International Horticultural Exhibitions.

Category

List by date

Planned expositions

Proposed expositions

 2027 Horticulture: Yokohama
 2027/2028: TBD
 Belgrade, Serbia
 Málaga, Spain
 Minnesota, United States
 Phuket, Thailand
 San Carlos de Bariloche, Argentina
 2030: TBD
 Busan, South Korea have held five conferences to attract attention for a 2030 bid, and submitted a proposal to BIE to host on 23 June 2021
 Odessa, Ukraine
 Rome, Italy
 Riyadh, Saudi Arabia

List by country

See also
List of world's fairs
Colonial exhibition
Human zoo

References

External links
European Patent Office

&
World Expositions
World Expositions
&
Expositions